Ellsworth Elmer "Bert" Cunningham (November 25, 1865 – May 14, 1952), was a Major League Baseball pitcher from 1887 to 1901. He played for the Brooklyn Grays, Baltimore Orioles, Philadelphia Athletics, Buffalo Bisons, Louisville Colonels, and Chicago Orphans.

On September 15, 1890, while playing for Buffalo in the Players' League, Cunningham threw five wild pitches in one inning. This record still stands today, although it was tied in a 2000 playoff game by St. Louis Cardinals pitcher Rick Ankiel.

In 1996, Cunningham was inducted into the Delaware Sports Museum and Hall of Fame.

References

External links

1865 births
1952 deaths
Major League Baseball pitchers
Baseball players from Wilmington, Delaware
19th-century baseball players
Buffalo Bisons (PL) players
Brooklyn Grays players
Baltimore Orioles (AA) players
Baltimore Orioles (NL) players
Louisville Colonels players
Chicago Cubs players
Philadelphia Athletics (PL) players
St. Paul Saints (AA) players
Rock Island-Moline Twins players
Green Bay Bays players
Scranton Miners players
Montgomery Colts players
Kansas City Blues (baseball) players
Sioux City Cornhuskers players
Rock Island Islanders players